Michael Cusack may refer to:

Michael Cusack (Gaelic Athletic Association), Irish teacher and founder of the Gaelic Athletic Association
Michael Cusack (animator), co-creator of Smiling Friends and YOLO: Crystal Fantasy
Michael Cusack (rugby union) (born 1984), rugby union footballer
Michael Cusack (cyclist) (born 1955), Irish author and former racing cyclist
Sir Michael Cusac-Smith, 3rd Baronet (1793–1859) of the Cusack-Smith baronets